Elections were held in  Western Visayas for seats in the House of Representatives of the Philippines on May 10, 2010.

The candidate with the most votes won that district's seat for the 15th Congress of the Philippines.

Summary

Aklan

Incumbent Florencio Miraflores is running unopposed.

Antique

Incumbent Exequiel Javier is in his third consecutive term already and is ineligible for reelection; his son Paolo Javier is his party's nominee for the district's seat.

Bacolod

Incumbent Monico Puentevella is in his third consecutive term already and is ineligible for reelection; he will run as mayor of Bacolod as Lakas-Kampi-CMD nominated Ricardo Tan in his place. He will face former Deputy Presidential Spokesperson Anthony Golez Jr. running under the Nationalist People's Coalition.

Capiz

1st District
Antonio Del Rosario is the incumbent.

2nd District
Incumbent Fredenil Castro is in his third consecutive term already and is ineligible for reelection; his wife Jane is his party's nominee for the district's seat.

Guimaras

Joaquin Carlos Nava is the incumbent.

Iloilo

1st District
Incumbent Janette Garin is running unopposed.

2nd District
Incumbent Judy Syjuco is not running; her husband Technical Education and Skills Development Authority Secretary Augusto is her party's nominee for the district's seat.

3rd District
Incumbent Arthur Defensor Sr.  is in his third consecutive term already and is ineligible for reelection and running for governor of Iloilo; his son Arthur Jr. is his party's nominee for the district's seat.

4th District
Incumbent Ferjenel Biron will face outgoing governor Neil Tupas.

5th District
Niel Tupas Jr. is the incumbent.

Iloilo City

Raul Gonzalez Jr. is the incumbent. And he will face outgoing Iloilo City Mayor Jerry Treñas

The result of the election is under protest in the House of Representatives Electoral Tribunal.

Negros Occidental

1st District
Julio Ledesma IV is the incumbent.

2nd District
Alfredo Marañon III is the incumbent.

3rd District
Incumbent Jose Carlos Lacson is not running; his party Lakas-Kampi-CMD did not name a nominee to run in this district.

4th District
Incumbent Jeffrey Ferrer is running unopposed.

5th District
Iggy Arroyo is the incumbent.

6th District
Incumbent Genero Alvarez Jr. is running as vice governor of Negros Occidental; his party nominated his daughter Mercedes as their nominee for the district's seat.

References

External links
Official website of the Commission on Elections

2010 Philippine general election
2010